The 2005 Season was the 19th edition of the United Soccer Leagues season.

General
 A-League renamed USL First Division.
 Pro Soccer League renamed USL Second Division.
 The newly renamed top two divisions each become single table.
 The Syracuse Salty Dogs, Milwaukee Wave United, Edmonton Aviators, and Calgary Mustangs of the First Division folded following the 2004 season.
 The Utah Blitzz of the Second Division folded following the 2004 season.
 The Cincinnati Kings joined the Second Division, as an expansion club, for the 2005 season.
 The Westchester Flames, San Diego Gauchos, and California Gold switched from the Second Division to the PDL for the 2005 season.

Honors

First Division

Playoffs
Each round except the final was a two-game aggregate goal series decided by extra time and a penalty shoot-out immediately following the second game of the series, if necessary. The away goals rule was not used as a tie-breaker. Tournament was re-seeded after the first round.

Awards and All-League Teams
First Team
F: Fabian Dawkins (Atlanta Silverbacks); Jason Jordan (Vancouver Whitecaps) (MVP & Leading Goalscorer); Mauricio Salles (Puerto Rico Islanders)
M: Hugo Alcaraz-Cuellar (Portland Timbers); Mauro Biello (Montreal Impact); Steve Klein (Vancouver Whitecaps); Kirk Wilson (Rochester Raging Rhinos)
D: Gabriel Gervais (Montreal Impact); Taylor Graham (Seattle Sounders) (Defender of the Year); Scot Thompson (Portland Timbers)
G: Greg Sutton (Montreal Impact) (Goalkeeper of the Year)
Coach: Nick De Santis (Montreal Impact) (Coach of the Year)

Second Team
F: Dan Antoniuk (Portland Timbers); Johnny Menyongar (Minnesota Thunder); Melvin Tarley (Minnesota Thunder)
M: Darren Caskey (Virginia Beach Mariners); Jeff Matteo (Minnesota Thunder); Rodrigo Rios (Atlanta Silverbacks); Petter Villegas (Puerto Rico Islanders))
D: Ben Hollingsworth (Charleston Battery); Peter Luzak (Richmond Kickers); Nevio Pizzolitto (Montreal Impact)
G: Preston Burpo (Seattle Sounders)

Second Division

Playoffs 

Charlotte lost 0-1 and then on the second leg won 2-1. The tied series in aggregate then went into overtime periods where Charlotte scored 2 goals.

Premier Development League
See 2005 PDL Season

See also
 United Soccer Leagues

References

External links
 Official USL Site

 
2005 in Canadian soccer
2005
2005
2